After-School All-Stars (ASAS) is a national non-profit organization that partners with schools across the United States to expand the learning day for low-income children. It provides after-school programs.  Currently, ASAS serves nearly 92,000 students on over 400 school sites in 14 regions across 10 states.

History 
ASAS history begins in Los Angeles, where, in 1991, ASAS founder Arnold Schwarzenegger was invited to serve as Executive Commissioner of the Inner City Games (ICG) by Daniel Hernandez of the Hollenbeck Youth Center. ICG was a citywide health and fitness program designed to help at-risk youth develop self-esteem and a sense of personal value. The powerful impact ICG had on its young participants was unmistakable and inspired the creation of the Inner City Games Foundation (ICGF) in 1992.

Between 1992 and 2000, ICGF expanded to 15 additional cities across the country.  Based on research, experience, and dialogue with law-enforcement, it was clear that the after-school hours were when children needed ASAS most.  ICGF transformed its model to provide after-school programming that was offered every day of the school year, supplemented with additional summer programming.  In 2003, ICGF was renamed After-School All-Stars to reflect the significant enhancement of programming and holistic approach to extended-day learning. (Please see holistic education for more information)

ASAS currently serves over 92,000 low-income, at-risk youth at 400 Title I schools in 15 major cities across the country: Atlanta, Chicago, Columbus, Dallas, Dayton, Honolulu, Las Vegas, Los Angeles, Miami, New York, Orlando, San Antonio, San Diego, San Francisco, and Toledo. 93% of ASAS students are minority, 86% qualify for the Federal Free and Reduced Lunch Program (see National School Lunch Act) and 62% are in the middle school grades. Together they championed a national effort found through the Inner-City Games Foundation established in 1995

Program Details

Introduction to the program
Students who want to be a part of ASAS do not have to pay any fees. ASA focuses its effort on Title I schools. These are schools where "50% of students qualify for the Federal Free and Reduced Lunch Program". ASAS has about 367 chapters across the United States. Students never have to travel alone to a program and because programs are run as close to the schools as possible, otherwise transportation services are provided by ASAS.

Target Market
ASAS primarily serves children at the middle school level because it is usually the most neglected age group for after school programs. Most middle school students do not have the luxury of day care services or after school activities and are often left with few to none safe activities to engage in after school from 3pm-6pm. Several studies have shown that if students are left alone and on their own during these hours, they are more likely to experience an increase in delinquent behavior and become involved with substance use and high-risk sexual behavior.

Demographics Served 
After School All Stars serves over 92,000 underprivileged children in America.

Gender
The comparison of male to female is:
 Female
 52%
Male
48%

School Level
It serves elementary, middle and high school children:
 Elementary
 33%
 Middle School
 58%
 High School
 9%

Ethnicity
ASAS also serves a variety of ethnicities: 
African-American/Black
25%
Asian-American
4%
Latino/a
58%
Pacific Islander
2%
White
9%
Other
2%

Locations
ASAS has hundreds of chapters and these are the locations and important details of the cities ASAS is located in:
ASAS NATIONAL
92,152 students, 367 sites
ASAS ATLANTA
2,717 students, 15 schools
ASAS CHICAGO
38,791 students, 173 schools
ASAS HAWAII
2,028 students, 11 schools
ASAS LAS VEGAS
5,236 students, 14 schools
ASAS LOS ANGELES
17,877 students, 42 schools
 ASAS NEW JERSEY
700 students, 4 schools
ASAS NEW YORK
2,215 students, 2 schools
ASAS NORTH TEXAS
350 students, 2 school
ASAS OHIO
886 students, 8 schools
ASAS ORLANDO
2,239 students, 8 schools
ASAS SAN ANTONIO
5,884 students, 28 schools
ASAS SAN FRANCISCO BAY AREA
2,227 students, 24 schools
ASAS SOUTH FLORIDA
5,477 students, 32 schools
ASAS Washington, D.C.
150 students, 1 schools

Program Partners/Ambassadors
Some of the most important and influential brand ambassadors and partners that have helped ASAS through the years are:
Metro PCS
New York Life Foundation
FOX Sports
Westime
Mott Foundation
Windsong Trust
Audemars Piguet
Jameer Nelson
Brandon Bass
Skechers
Chris Bosh
Walmart
Kobe Bryant
Arnold Schwarzenegger
Dwayne 'The Rock' Johnson
Jackie Chan
Hummer
Todd Wagner Foundation
Misha Malyshev

References 

Educational charities based in the United States
Community organizations
After school programs
Youth organizations established in 1992
Non-profit organizations based in Los Angeles
Charities based in California